The 2011–12 Auburn Tigers men's basketball team represented Auburn University in the sport of basketball during the 2011–12 college basketball season. The Tigers competed in Division I of the National Collegiate Athletic Association (NCAA) and the Southeastern Conference (SEC). They were led by head coach Tony Barbee, and played their home games at Auburn Arena on the university's Auburn, Alabama campus.

Previous season
The Tigers finished the 2010–11 season 11–20 overall, 4–12 in SEC play and lost in the first round of the SEC tournament to Georgia.

Roster

Schedule

|-
!colspan=9 style=|Exhibition

|-
!colspan=9 style=|Regular Season

|-
!colspan=9 style=| SEC Tournament

References

Auburn
Auburn Tigers men's basketball seasons
Auburn Tigers men's basketball team
Auburn Tigers men's basketball team